Elizabeth Norton is a British historian specialising in the queens of England and the Tudor period. She obtained a Master of Arts in archaeology and anthropology from the University of Cambridge, being awarded a Double First Class degree, and a master's degree in European archaeology from the University of Oxford. She is the author of thirteen non-fiction books.

Biography
Norton grew up in Steyning, West Sussex, and attended Steyning Grammar School. She studied archaeology and anthropology at New Hall, Cambridge, and later completed a master's degree in European archaeology at Hertford College, Oxford.

She was a member of a university research group led by Jeremy Keenan to the Algerian Sahara which surveyed prehistoric rock art and travelled with the Tuareg people. The anthropologist Mary Ann Craig was also a member of this group. Norton has also carried out archaeological fieldwork in Hungary.

Her television appearances include Bloody Tales of the Tower (National Geographic), The Book Show (Sky Arts), Flog It! (BBC One) and BBC Breakfast (BBC One). She regularly appears as an expert on BBC London News and is often featured on radio, including The Robert Elms Show on BBC Radio London.

In 2019, she completed a Doctor of Philosophy at the University of Oxford. Her thesis was titled The Blount Family in the long Sixteenth century and she was supervised by Hannah Dawson and Laura Gowing.

Norton lives in Kingston upon Thames with her husband and sons.

Published works
Elizabeth Norton is the author of thirteen non-fiction works: 
She Wolves, The Notorious Queens of England (The History Press, 2008)
Anne Boleyn, Henry VIII's Obsession (Amberley, 2008)
Jane Seymour, Henry VIII's True Love (Amberley, 2009)
Anne of Cleves, Henry VIII's Discarded Bride (Amberley, 2009)
Catherine Parr (Amberley, 2010);
Margaret Beaufort, Mother of the Tudor Dynasty (Amberley, 2010)
Anne Boleyn, In Her Own Words and the Words of Those Who Knew Her (Amberley, 2011)
England's Queens: The Biography (Amberley, 2011)
Bessie Blount (Amberley, 2011)
The Boleyn Women (Amberley, 2013) 
Elfrida: The First Crowned Queen of England (Amberley, 2013)
The Tudor Treasury (Andre Deutsch, 2014)
The Temptation of Elizabeth Tudor (Head of Zeus, 2015)
The Hidden Lives of Tudor Women – a Social History (Pegasus, 2017)

She is also the author of a number of articles, including 
"Anne of Cleves and Richmond Palace" (Surrey History, 2009)
"Scandinavian Influences in the Late Anglo-Saxon Sculpture of Sussex" (Sussex Archaeological Collections, 2009).

She regularly writes for history and family history magazines, including BBC History, Who Do You Think You Are? and Your Family Tree.

References

External link
Official website

1986 births
Living people
Alumni of Hertford College, Oxford
Alumni of New Hall, Cambridge
British women historians
British writers
English historians
People educated at Steyning Grammar School
People from Steyning